4-Methyl-αMT (4-Me-αMT), also known as 4,α-dimethyltryptamine (4,α-DMT), and MP-809, is a drug belonging to the tryptamine class that was investigated as an antidepressant in the early 1960s but was never marketed.

See also 
 4-Methyl-αET
 α-Ethyltryptamine (αET)
 α-Methyltryptamine (αMT)

References 

Psychedelic tryptamines
Serotonin receptor agonists
Serotonin-norepinephrine-dopamine releasing agents